Ali Sara (also Romanized as ‘Alī Sarā; also known as ‘Alī Seh Rāh) is a village in Gasht Rural District, in the Central District of Fuman County, Gilan Province, Iran. At the 2006 census, its population was 296, in 85 families.

References 

Populated places in Fuman County